Kovda is a river in Murmansk Oblast, Russia.

Kovda may also refer to the following rural localities in Kandalakshsky District of Murmansk Oblast, Russia:
Kovda, Lesozavodsky Territorial Okrug, Kandalakshsky District, Murmansk Oblast, a selo in Lesozavodsky Territorial Okrug
Kovda, Zelenoborsky, Kandalakshsky District, Murmansk Oblast, a railway station under the administrative jurisdiction of the urban-type settlement of Zelenoborsky